Katherine Singer Kovacs Prize is a literary prize awarded annually in honour of Katherine Singer Kovács  to any book that is published in English or Spanish in the field of Latin American and Spanish literatures and cultures. The prize was established in 1909 with a monetary gift from Joseph and Mimi B. Singer, who were the parents of Kovacs.  Kovacs was a specialist in Spanish and Latin American literature and film. The awarding of the prize is managed by a Prize Selection Committee of the Modern Language Association.

Katherine Singer Kovacs Prize Winners

See also
 Katherine Singer Kovács Society for Cinema and Media Studies Book Award

References

Awards established in 1909
English-language literary awards
Spanish-language literary awards